The 2000 Volta a Catalunya was the 80th edition of the Volta a Catalunya cycle race and was held from 15 June to 22 June 2000. The race was won by José María Jiménez of the Banesto team.

Teams
Sixteen teams of up to eight riders started the race:

Route

General classification

References

2000
Volta
2000 in Spanish road cycling
June 2000 sports events in Europe